Wrench is a surname, and may refer to:

Benjamin Wrench (1778–1843), English actor
Christopher Wrench (born 1958), Australian organist and lecturer
Connor Wrench (born 2001), British rugby player
David Wrench (disambiguation), multiple people
Edward Thomas Jones Wrench (1828–1893), Australian businessman
Edwin Wrench (1876–1948), English-born Australian politician
Evelyn Wrench (1882–1966), British journalist
George Wrench (1876–1948), English-born Australian politician
Guy T. Wrench (1877–1954), British agronomist and physician
John Wrench (1911–2009), American mathematician
John Mervyn Dallas Wrench (1883–1961), British engineer
Margaret Stanley-Wrench (1916–1974), English poet and author
Mark Wrench (born 1969), English footballer
Nigel Wrench, English radio presenter
Sarah Wrench  (1833–1848), reputed witch buried at East Mersea